The Henry Crawford Tucker Log House and Farmstead is a  property near Moultrie, Georgia which was listed on the National Register of Historic Places in 1982.  It is located at the end of a long dirt road, about midway between Funston and Moultrie, in Colquitt County, Georgia.

The house, built in c.1820s to c.1840s, is a one-story dog trot log house, with additional shed porches and enclosed porch rooms.  Its main part is built of hand-hewn logs with dove-tail notching.

References

Houses on the National Register of Historic Places in Georgia (U.S. state)
National Register of Historic Places in Colquitt County, Georgia
Log houses in the United States
Farms in Georgia (U.S. state)